John Arthur McCarthy (March 26, 1869 – February 1, 1948) was a professional baseball outfielder. He played in Major League Baseball for the Cincinnati Reds, Pittsburgh Pirates, Chicago Orphans, Cleveland Blues / Bronchos / Naps, Chicago Cubs and Brooklyn Superbas. In 1092 games spanning over 12 seasons, McCarthy recorded a .287 batting average with 551 runs, 171 doubles, 66 triples, 8 home runs, 476 RBI and 145 stolen bases. He ended his career with a .947 fielding percentage.

His last home run was hit in 1899, and from 1900 to the present no one has had more at-bats without a home run: 2,736.  In 1904, McCarthy suffered an unusual injury when he tripped over the broom used by the umpire to clean home plate, and injured his ankle. Soon afterwards, a rule specified that umpires would clean home plate with a whisk broom and store it in their pocket when not in use. On April 26, 1905, McCarthy is the first fielder to throw out three base runners at home plate, achieving the feat against the Pittsburgh Pirates. 

He attended Holy Cross College before joining the major leagues. In 1899, he married Jessie Halpin. After his playing days, he remained in baseball for a time as a minor league manager, then took other jobs, being listed in 1930 as a clerk in a Chicago probate court.

References

External links

Peter Morris, Baseball Historian 

1869 births
1948 deaths
Major League Baseball outfielders
Baseball players from Massachusetts
19th-century baseball players
Chicago Cubs players
Chicago Orphans players
Pittsburgh Pirates players
Cincinnati Reds players
Cleveland Blues (1901) players
Cleveland Naps players
Cleveland Bronchos players
Brooklyn Superbas players
Minor league baseball managers
Manchester Amskoegs players
Charleston Seagulls players
Brockton Shoemakers players
Indianapolis Hoosiers (minor league) players
Indianapolis Indians players
Springfield Senators players
People from Hardwick, Massachusetts
Sportspeople from Worcester County, Massachusetts
Mattoon-Charleston Canaries players